The Virginia Beach Fire Department (VBFD) provides fire protection and emergency medical services to the city of Virginia Beach, Virginia. The independent city is home to a population of 450,882, not including the summer population growth due to tourism, making it the most populous city in Virginia and the 39th largest city in the United States.

History

The Virginia Beach Fire Department began as an all-volunteer department in 1906 when the Town Council noted the need to provide fire equipment to protect the rapidly growing resort area. During the next 20 years, the volunteer department met the many challenges that it faced but noted that 24-hour fire protection was desperately needed. In 1928, the town hired a paid staff of firefighters that also performed the duties of police officers. This dual duty system was necessary as the town did not have the funding to hire single function employees. With the help of the volunteers, this combination system maintained fire protection for the Town of Virginia Beach from one fire station located at 20th Street and Arctic Avenue and numerous “volunteer” departments that sprang up during the 1940’s and 1950’s that maintained fire protection in Princess Anne County.
 
24th Street Fire Station circa 1920sOn January 1, 1963, the Town of Virginia Beach merged with Princess Anne County to form the City of Virginia Beach and the Virginia Beach Fire Department.  The volunteer departments maintained their volunteer Fire Chiefs and Chief E. B. Bayne was appointed to the position of Fire Chief of the Beach Borough Fire Department. On September 1, 1971, Chief Bayne was appointed as the first Fire Chief of the City of Virginia Beach Fire Department and remained in this capacity until his retirement in June 1974. Chief Bayne’s early focus was to secure funding to start the transformation from an all-volunteer system in the county into a modern career fire department. This required a concerted focus on staffing and apparatus for existing volunteer facilities, as well as addressing the rapidly expanding business and residential areas. Human, physical, and fiscal resources were stretched to their limits to address service delivery demands. 
 
The existence of the volunteer organizations in old Princess Anne County provided instant platforms for the delivery of emergency services, as well as quite a few volunteer owned apparatus to facilitate the continuity of fire and emergency medical services across the fledgling City. The locations of the stations were originally determined by neighborhoods being large enough to support the stations with funding, volunteer labor, land availability, and the desire of the community to reduce response times.
 
Since the merger in 1963, the department has 6 stations that have been rebuilt or relocated; 3 that have been rebuilt on or next to the older facility site; and 6 new facilities that have been built in new areas of development. The remaining stations are scheduled for replacement or rehabilitation as funding permits. Additionally, the Department has grown from a career staff of 11 members in 1963 to over 500 career members, more than 42 civilian support staff members, over 800 Community Emergency Response Team (CERT) volunteer members, and numerous volunteer firefighters and support team members.
 
Harry E. Diezel was appointed the Fire Chief on May 1, 1974.  Chief Diezel’s appointment coincided with the rapid growth of the City, expanding from a population base of 200,000.  Fire Chief Harry E. Diezel retired in September 1997.  Deputy Chief James W. Carter was appointed Interim Fire Chief upon Chief Diezel’s retirement.  In August 1998, Gregory B. Cade was appointed Fire Chief and retired in 2007.  Steven R. Cover was appointed the Interim Fire Chief July 2007 and was appointed the Fire Chief on November 1, 2007.  David W. Hutcheson was appointed the Interim Fire Chief November 2016 and was appointed the Fire Chief in June 2017. Ken Pravetz was selected to assume the role of Chief upon Hutcheson's retirement on January 1, 2023.
 
Today the Virginia Beach Fire Department, a metropolitan-sized organization, provides an all-hazard response that includes: Fire Suppression, Emergency Management, Hazardous Materials, Technical Rescue, Marine, Fire Inspections, Fire Investigations, Life Safety Education, Fire Training, Safety, Health and Wellness, and disaster response from Virginia Task Force 2, a FEMA Urban Search and Rescue Team. In addition, the Department is a member of the Virginia Beach Emergency Response System and provides emergency medical technicians and paramedics to assist the Department of Emergency Medical Services with providing Advanced Life Support response to the community. The Virginia Beach Fire Department received its Accredited Agency status with the Commission on Fire Accreditation International (CFAI).  The Department was initially accredited in 2001 and reaccredited in 2006 and 2011. The Virginia Beach Fire Department has established itself as a local, regional, state, and national leader in numerous areas and continues to strive for excellence in delivering services to the City..

Operations

USAR Task Force 2

The Virginia Beach Fire Department is the founding member of one of Virginia's two FEMA Urban Search and Rescue Task Force. Virginia Task Force 2 (VA-TF2) is available to respond to natural or man-made disasters around the country and the world to assist with search and rescue, medical support, damage assessment and communications.

Marine Operations
The team also provides mutual aid to parts of North Carolina as well as the U.S. Coast Guard. The operations team has three fireboats at their disposal:
 Fireboat 1 is a  Argus Class Northwind with an enclosed cabin and a  pump docked in Lynnhaven Inlet.:
 Fireboat 6 is a  Metal Shark aluminum response vessel with a  pump docked at Station 6 in Creeds.
 Fireboat 12 is a former USCG  utility boat that is designed to operate under rough weather and sea conditions where its speed and maneuverability make it an ideal platform. It is kept at the City Dredge Ops marina located in Owls Creek.

Stations and Apparatus

References

Fire departments in Virginia
Fire
1963 establishments in Virginia